ABT-202 is a drug developed by Abbott, which acts as an agonist at neural nicotinic acetylcholine receptors and has been researched for use as an analgesic, although it has not passed clinical trials.

References 

Analgesics
Nicotinic agonists
3-Pyridyl compounds
Pyrrolidines
Stimulants